"Dalla Dalla" is the debut single by South Korean girl group Itzy. The song was released to digital outlets as the lead single from their debut single album, It'z Different, on February 12, 2019, through JYP Entertainment. Written and composed by the music production group Galactika, the song is a "fusion" track that includes elements of EDM, hip hop, electropop, and house. Lyrically, "Dalla Dalla" revolves around themes of individuality, empowerment and self-confidence.

"Dalla Dalla" received mixed reviews from music critics, many of whom compared the concept and style to that of other K-pop girl groups, but praised Itzy's performance. Commercially, the song peaked at number two on both the Gaon Digital Chart and the Billboard K-pop Hot 100. Nine months after release, the song was certified platinum by the Korea Music Content Association (KMCA) for achieving 100 million streams. The song's music video, which was pre-released on YouTube, became the most-viewed debut music video by a K-pop group in 24-hours at the time, accumulating 17.1 million views. To promote the track, Itzy appeared on several music programs in South Korea, and won nine first-place trophies.

Background and release
On January 14, 2019, it was reported that JYP Entertainment had completed filming the music video for their new girl group. On January 21, a video titled "PROLOGUE FILM: ITZY" was released by JYP Entertainment on their official social media accounts unveiling the name and the members of the group. A teaser for the music video was released on February 1, which confirmed "Dalla Dalla" as the title of the debut single. The music video for the single was pre-released on February 11, at midnight Korea Standard Time (KST), and the song was released for digital download and streaming on February 12, at 18:00 KST, as the lead single from their debut single album, It'z Different.

A remix version of the song was included on the group's debut extended play (EP), It'z Icy, which was released on July 29, 2019. On January 22, 2021, Itzy released their first English-language EP, Not Shy (English ver.), which featured the English version of "Dalla Dalla". Itzy's first compilation album It'z Itzy, released on December 22, 2021, includes both Korean and Japanese-language versions of "Dalla Dalla". The Japanese lyrics were written by D&H and Yohei.

Composition

"Dalla Dalla" was written and composed by music production team Galactika. The song is composed in the key of B minor, and carries an average tempo of 125 beats per minute. It has been described as a lively and upbeat "fusion groove" song that includes elements of popular genres, such as EDM, hip hop, electropop and house. The members of the group explained that "Dalla Dalla" is a song which is "hard to define, but all the more lovable because of that." The song lyrically weighs on confidence, inspiration and empowerment. "Dalla" (달라) means "different" in Korean, with lyrics including: "I'm different from other kids. Don't try to measure me by your standard. ... I love myself, I'm somewhat different, yeah. I'm different from you."

Critical reception

"Dalla Dalla" received mixed reviews from music critics. Tamar Herman of Billboard called the track an "empowering anthem, introducing ITZY as a group that's an alternative to its peers," as well as "feisty and quick to shift tempos and genres," highlighting its "hip-hop breakdowns" throughout. Writing for Kotaku, Seung Park judged it to be an "eclectic mashup of a mature version of some of Red Velvet's more esoteric work with Blackpink or 2NE1's hip-hop-esque aesthetic." Park added that the song is a "solid opening bell of what is shaping up to be a long and interesting career." In a more negative review, IZMs Jeong Yeon-kyung said, "Itzy does not have its own 'something'." She felt that "[t]he synergy is weak" and the "musical style does not match the tone of the main vocalist." She went on to compare it to Miss A's "I Don't Need a Man".

Taylor Glasby from Dazed ranked it eighth on their list of 2019's best K-pop songs, writing the song "evokes two outlandish 90s moments: the wobbly bass of... "Flat Beat" and the brat-pop of... "Trouble"." She added, "Like the latter, "Dalla Dalla" owes more to its artists' personalities, and despite several coats of K-pop polish, embodies that same scrappy energy and ballsy confidence." In 2020, the lyrics of "Dalla Dalla" were displayed in an exhibition titled "Korean Pop Lyrics: Melodies of Life" at the National Hangeul Museum in Seoul.

Awards
Itzy received the Digital Bonsang award at the 34th Golden Disc Awards for "Dalla Dalla" due to its success on digital platforms in South Korea. The song also amassed top spot on various music programs; it achieved 9 wins including a "triple crown" (three wins) on Inkigayo.

Commercial performance
"Dalla Dalla" was a commercial success in South Korea. The song entered the Gaon Digital Chart at number five for the week ending February 16, 2019. After three weeks of its release, "Dalla Dalla" rose three positions to the number two spot on the chart for the week ending March 9. It also peaked at number two on Billboards K-pop Hot 100 chart of March 16. The song was placed number six on Gaon's mid-year Digital, Download, and Streaming charts. It was certified platinum by Korea Music Content Association (KMCA) for 100 million streams on November 7, 2019. "Dalla Dalla" ranked 11th on the year-end Gaon Digital Chart, making it the best-performing girl group song and second best-performing group song of 2019 in South Korea. Elsewhere, the song reached number two in the United States on Billboards World Digital Song Sales chart. It also peaked at 20 in New Zealand on the RMNZ Hot Singles chart, and at 31 on the Billboard Japan Hot 100.

Music video and promotion
The music video for "Dalla Dalla" was directed by Naive Creative Production and was uploaded to JYP Entertainment's official YouTube channel on February 11, 2019. Emlyn Travis from BuzzFeed ranked it 18th on their year-end list of 30 best K-pop music videos and commented, "From dancing on fancy cars to unleashing their kaleidoscopic superpowers, "Dalla Dalla" is an explosion of rainbows and self-confidence." Yoon So-yeon of Korea JoongAng Daily wrote that the music video reminds of other "K-pop girl groups such as Blackpink or 4Minute, who also went for powerful feminine vibes." While, K-Pop Heralds Hong Dam-young said, "The act's efforts to differentiate itself from the herd is also shown in the single's vibrant music video, where the girls showcase their badass vibe while clad in flashy sequined outfits." It became the most viewed debut music video in the first 24 hours by a K-pop group with 17.1 million views. It also became the fastest K-pop debut music video to reach 100 million views, and was ranked as the second most popular music video of 2019 on YouTube in South Korea.

Itzy held a live broadcast called "The 1st Single Live Premiere" on V Live to commemorate their debut, where they also performed the full choreography of the song for the first time. The group promoted "Dalla Dalla" on several music programs in South Korea, including M Countdown, Music Bank, Show! Music Core, Inkigayo, and Show Champion, in the later half of February.

Credits and personnel
Credits adapted from NetEase Music.

 Itzy — primary vocals
 Galactika — lyricists, composers, arrangers, background vocals recording 
 Athena — composer, keyboards 
 FRIDAY. — background vocals 
 Chang — drums 
 e.NA — background vocals 
 Jeong Yoo-ra — digital editing 
 Honzo — digital editing 
 Eom Se-hee — recording, assistant mixer 
 Kang Yeon-nu — recording
 Lee Tae-seop — mixer 
 Chris Gehringer — mastering

Charts

Weekly charts

Monthly charts

Year-end charts

Certifications

|-

Release history

See also
 List of certified songs in South Korea
 List of Inkigayo Chart winners (2019)
 List of M Countdown Chart winners (2019)
 List of Music Bank Chart winners (2019)
 List of Show! Music Core Chart winners (2019)

Notes

References

Itzy songs
2019 songs
2019 debut singles
JYP Entertainment singles